Russell Brown is a filmmaker from Los Angeles, California. He is known for writing and directing the films Loren & Rose (2021), The 44 Scarves of Liza Minnelli (2019), Search Engines (2016), Annie and the Gypsy (2012), The Blue Tooth Virgin (2008), and Race You to the Bottom (2005). Brown has also directed a number of documentaries and short films.

Education and career
Brown attended the University of Southern California (USC) where he graduated Phi Beta Kappa in 1997 with a BA in Critical Studies. While at USC, Brown interned at Mandalay Entertainment Group. He has served as a creative executive at Columbia Pictures with Laura Ziskin Productions and at Paramount Pictures with Saturday Night Live Studios.

Filmography

References

External links
 

American documentary film directors
American documentary film producers
Film directors from Los Angeles
University of Southern California alumni
Year of birth missing (living people)
Living people